AH64 may refer to:

Boeing AH-64 Apache, an American attack helicopter
AH64 (highway), a highway in Asia